Cosmos 1 was a project by Cosmos Studios and The Planetary Society to test a solar sail in space. As part of the project, an unmanned solar-sail spacecraft named Cosmos 1 was launched into space at 19:46:09 UTC (15:46:09 EDT) on 21 June 2005 from the submarine  in the Barents Sea. However, a rocket failure prevented the spacecraft from reaching its intended orbit. Once in orbit, the spacecraft was supposed to deploy a large sail, upon which photons from the Sun would push, thereby increasing the spacecraft's velocity (the contributions from the solar wind are similar, but of much smaller magnitude).

Had the mission been successful, it would have been the first ever orbital use of a solar sail to speed up a spacecraft, as well as the first space mission by a space advocacy group. The project budget was US$4 million. The Planetary Society planned to raise another US$4 million for Cosmos 2, a reimplementation of the experiment provisionally to be launched on a Soyuz resupply mission to the International Space Station (ISS). The Discovery Channel was an early investor. However, advances in technology and the greater availability of lower-mass piggyback slots on more launch vehicles led to a redesign similar to NanoSail-D, called LightSail-1, announced in November 2009.

Planned mission profile 
To test the solar sail concept, the Cosmos 1 project launched an orbital spacecraft they named Cosmos 1 with a full complement of eight sail blades on 21 June 2005; the summer solstice.

The spacecraft was launched on a Volna launch vehicle (a converted SS-N-18 intercontinental ballistic missile (ICBM)) from the Russian Delta III submarine , submerged in the Barents Sea. The sails would then have gradually raised the spacecraft to a higher Earth orbit. "Cosmos 1 might boost its orbit  over the expected 30-day life of the mission", said Louis Friedman of The Planetary Society.

The mission was expected to end within a month of launch, as the mylar of the blades would degrade in sunlight.

Possible beam propulsion 
The solar-sail craft could also have been used to measure the effect of artificial microwaves aimed at it from a radar installation. A  dish at the Goldstone facility of NASA Deep Space Network would have been used to irradiate the sail with a 450 kW beam. This experiment in beam-powered propulsion would only have been attempted after the prime mission objective of controlled solar-sail flight was achieved.

Tracking 
The craft would have been visible to the naked eye from most of the Earth's surface: the planned orbit had an inclination of 80°, so it would have been visible from latitudes of up to approximately 80° north and south.

Mission control was based primarily at the Russian company NPO Lavochkin in Moscow; a center that the Planetary Society calls Mission Operations Moscow (MOM).

Physics 

The craft would have been gradually accelerating during each orbit as a result of the radiation pressure of photons colliding with the sails. As photons reflected from the surface of the sails, they would transfer momentum to them. As there would be no air resistance to oppose the velocity of the spacecraft, acceleration would be proportional to the number of photons colliding with it per unit time. Sunlight amounts to a tiny  acceleration in the vicinity of the Earth. Over one day, the spacecraft's speed would reach ; in 100 days its speed would be , in 2.74 years .

At that speed, a craft would reach Pluto, a very distant dwarf planet in the Solar System, in less than 5 years, although in practice the acceleration of a sail drops dramatically as the spacecraft gets farther from the Sun.

Other aspects 
Besides the main spacecraft, launched in June 2005, the Cosmos 1 project has funded two other craft:
 A suborbital test was attempted in 2001 with only two sail blades. The spacecraft failed to separate from the rocket.
 A second orbital spacecraft (LightSail-1) was launched  in May 2015.

One of Cosmos 1 solar-sail blades was displayed at the Rockefeller Center office complex in New York City in 2003.

References

External links 

 Cosmos 1 homepage at the Planetary Society
 Planetary Society's solar sail updates and press releases - current information about the Cosmos 2 follow-on project.
 Cosmos 1 page (flash only) from Cosmos Studios
 
 Space technology: Setting sail for history (Nature, February 16, 2005)
 Space yacht rides to stars on rays of sunlight (The Guardian, February 27, 2005)
 Cosmos 1 to test solar sail (Wired News, June 16, 2005)
 Cosmos 1 videos (Windows Media, RealPlayer, QuickTime formats)

Private spaceflight
Satellite launch failures
Spacecraft launched in 2005
Solar sail spacecraft
The Planetary Society
Rocket launches in 2005